During the 2000–01 season Fiorentina competed in Serie A, Coppa Italia and UEFA Cup.

Summary
Associazione Calcio Fiorentina fell a couple of steps back in its first season following striker Gabriel Batistuta's departure. While Batistuta finally won a long overdue Serie A title with Roma, Fiorentina had a struggling season, where coach Fatih Terim suddenly resigned and accepted the same job in Milan instead, and the club sensationally opted for recently retired Roberto Mancini to take over.

Although respectability in the league was upheld by goalkeeper Francesco Toldo, playmaker Rui Costa and striker Enrico Chiesa, both Toldo and Rui Costa departed for the Milanese clubs in the summer of 2001, as president Vittorio Cecchi Gori desperately tried to save a collapsing economy. Even though the top players of the club held very high standards, the depth in the squad was not at a very strong level, which would ensure 2001-02 to be a testing time for the Florence faithful.

The cup title was some consolation for the worries, with Paolo Vanoli scoring the winner against Parma in the first final, then drawing 1–1 at home, when Portuguese international Nuno Gomes scored the all-important equaliser.

Players

Transfers

Competitions

Serie A

League table

Results summary

Results by round

Matches

Coppa Italia

Round of 32
Bye.

Eightfinals

Quarterfinals

Semifinals

Finals

First leg

Second leg

UEFA Cup

First round

Statistics

Players statistics

Goalscorers
  Enrico Chiesa 22 (3)
  Nuno Gomes 9
  Rui Costa 6
  Leandro 5 (1)

References

ACF Fiorentina seasons
Fiorentina